4ekolka is a prototype 3D printed single seat electric powered car designed made in the Czech Republic from 2016.

Origins
The 4ekolka was designed by architect Petr Chládek and was intended to be a city car that was small, inexpensive, safe, usable year-round, and for a maximum of two people. The prototype costed about CZK 300,000 in 2016 to construct and was a single seater. There is no information about any being made beyond the prototype.

Specifications
 55 km/h (~34 mph)  top speed
 LiFePO4 batteries with a capacity of 200Ah @ 48V totaling around 9.6 kWh
 About 200 km (124 miles) per charge
 Power consumption about 100 Wh

References

Motor vehicle manufacturers of Czechoslovakia
3D printed objects
Electric city cars
Cars introduced in 2016